Ransom Burnell (1821 - 1880) was a politician from California who served in the California State Assembly and California State Senate, and as President pro tempore of the State Senate and as Speaker of the Assembly, being one of only three people to hold both offices, along with James T. Farley and Toni Atkins. Burnell was elected speaker as a compromise candidate after the State Assembly took 10 days and 109 ballots to elect a speaker.

References 

|-

1821 births
1880 deaths
Speakers of the California State Assembly